The United Republic of Tanganyika and Zanzibar, competing under the name of Tanganyika, competed in the Olympic Games for the first time at the 1964 Summer Olympics in Tokyo, Japan.

Athletics

Men
Track & road events

References
Official Olympic Reports

Nations at the 1964 Summer Olympics
1964
1964 in Tanzanian sport